Aykut Erçetin (born 14 September 1982) is a former Turkish football goalkeeper.

Honours
Galatasaray
Süper Lig (4): 2005–06, 2007–08, 2011–12, 2012–13
Türkiye Kupası (2): 2004–05, 2013–14
Süper Kupa (3): 2008, 2012, 2013,

Career statistics

Club
.

References

External links

Profile at Galatasaray.org
Statistics at TFF.org 

1982 births
Living people
Turkish footballers
Turkey B international footballers
Turkey under-21 international footballers
Turkey youth international footballers
VfB Stuttgart II players
Galatasaray S.K. footballers
Süper Lig players
Association football goalkeepers
People from Göppingen
Sportspeople from Stuttgart (region)
21st-century Turkish people